Potten may refer to:

Agnes Potten (died 1556), Ipswich martyr
Nettleden with Potten End, a village in Hertfordshire, England
Potten Creek, a tributary to the River Roach
The plural of the Dutch word pot (see Dutch orthography)
Potten End, a village in west Hertfordshire, England